Virginia's 18th Senate district is one of 40 districts in the Senate of Virginia. It has been represented by Democrat Louise Lucas since 1992.

Geography
District 18 is located in southeastern Virginia, including all of Greensville County, Sussex County, and the City of Emporia, as well as parts of Brunswick County, Isle of Wight County, Southampton County, Surry County, and the cities of Chesapeake, Franklin, Portsmouth, and Suffolk.

The district overlaps with Virginia's 3rd, 4th, and 5th congressional districts, and with the 64th, 75th, 76th, 79th, and 80th districts of the Virginia House of Delegates. It borders the state of North Carolina.

Recent election results

2019

2015

2011

Federal and statewide results in District 18

Historical results
All election results below took place prior to 2011 redistricting, and thus were under different district lines.

2007

2003

1999

1995

References

Virginia Senate districts
Brunswick County, Virginia
Chesapeake, Virginia
Emporia, Virginia
Franklin, Virginia
Greensville County, Virginia
Isle of Wight County, Virginia
Portsmouth, Virginia
Southampton County, Virginia
Surry County, Virginia
Sussex County, Virginia